Erkki Kilpinen (born 20 June 1948) was a Finnish nordic combined skier who competed in the early 1970s. He finished fourth in the Nordic combined event at the 1972 Winter Olympics in Sapporo.

References

External links

Nordic combined skiers at the 1972 Winter Olympics
Nordic combined skiers at the 1976 Winter Olympics
Finnish male Nordic combined skiers
1948 births
Living people
Olympic Nordic combined skiers of Finland
20th-century Finnish people